

Biography 
Álvarez Valdez was born in Mexicali, Baja California, and was ordained to the priesthood in 1998. He served as bishop of the Roman Catholic Diocese of Gómez Palacio from 2016 until his death on 7 November 2018, a day shy of his 51st birthday.

Notes

1967 births
2018 deaths
21st-century Roman Catholic bishops in Mexico